The 1934 All-Eastern football team consists of American football players chosen by various selectors as the best players at each position among the Eastern colleges and universities during the 1934 college football season. 

Four players were selected to the first team by all four of the known selectors: quarterback Buzz Borries of Navy; halfback Jack Buckler of Army; tackle Jim Steen of Syracuse; and guard Chuck Hartwig for Pittsburgh.

The 1934 Pittsburgh Panthers football team were recognized as the 1934 national champion and placed seven players on at least one of the first-team All-Eastern teams. 

Three Eastern players received All-Eastern honors and were also consensus picks on the 1934 All-America college football team: guard Chuck Hartwig of Pittburgh; halfback Buzz Borries of Navy; and center George Shotwell of Pittsburgh.

All-Eastern selections

Quarterbacks
 Buzz Borries, Navy (AP-1 [hb], CP-1, AK, JS-1)
 Miller Munjas, Pittsburgh (AP-1)

Halfbacks
 Jack Buckler, Army (AP-1, CP-1, AK, JS-1)
 Nicksick, Pittsburgh (CP-1)
 Shepherd, Western Maryland (AK)
 Leemans, George Washington (JS-1)

Fullbacks
 Izzy Weinstock, Pittsburgh (AP-1, AK, JS-1)
 Smukler, Temple (CP-1)

Ends
 Joe Bogdanski, Colgate (AP-1, AK, JS-1)
 Lester Bordham, Fordham (AP-1, AK)
 Shuler, Army (CP-1)
 Rooker, Pittsburgh (CP-1)
 Goodwin, West Virginia (JS-1)

Tackles
 Jim Steen, Syracuse (AP-1, CP-1, AK, JS-1)
 Slade Cutter, Navy (AP-1, CP-1)
 Joe Stydahar, West Virginia (AK)
 Lewis Brooke, Colgate (JS-1)

Guards
 Chuck Hartwig, Pittsburgh (AP-1, CP-1, AK, JS-1)
 Kenneth Ormiston, Pittsburgh (AP-1, JS-1)
 Stillman, Army (CP-1)
 Moran, Holy Cross (AK)

Centers
 George Shotwell, Pittsburgh (AP-1, CP-1, JS-1)
 Stevens, Temple (AK)

Key
 AP = Associated Press
 CP = Central Press Association, selected by the football captains of the Eastern teams
 AK = Andrew Kerr, head coach of Colgate
 JS = Jock Sutherland, head coach of Pittsburgh

See also
 1934 College Football All-America Team

References

All-Eastern
All-Eastern college football teams